Tsarasaotra is a rural commune in Analamanga Region, in the  Central Highlands of Madagascar. It belongs to the district of Anjozorobe and its populations numbers to 4,084 in 2018.

Rivers
The commune is crossed by the Mananara river (Nord).

Economy
The economy is based on agriculture.  Rice, corn, peanuts, beans, manioc, soja and oignons are the main crops.

References

Populated places in Analamanga